Acerenza is a town and comune in the province of Potenza, in the Southern Italian region of Basilicata.

History

The town, then known as Aceruntia, Acheruntia or Acherontia, was conquered by the Romans in 318 BC. Later, it was taken by the Ostrogoths (it was mentioned as an important fortress during the Gothic Wars) and then the Lombards, who fortified the town. In 788 Charlemagne ordered that its walls be destroyed. In 1041,  after a period in which it was fought over by the Principality of Salerno and the Byzantine Empire, it was conquered again by the Norman Robert Guiscard.

The town has been the see of an archbishop since at least 499, when a Justus is known. According to legend, the town's first bishop was appointed by St. Peter.

From the 16th century, Acerenza was held under the feudal lordship of the Marquess of Galatone, that family being granted the title Duke of Acerenza on 12 April 1593 by Philip II of Spain. Through marriage the duchy of Acerenza was inherited by the family of the Prince Belmonte, in whose line the title has descended to the present day.

Main sights

Acerenza Cathedral, begun in 1080 by archbishop Arnando. In Romanesque-Gothic style, it houses a famed marble bust of Julian the Apostate. It has a nave and two aisles with 16th century canvasses, and a crypt from 1524.
The church of San Laviero Martire (12th century). It has a Baroque-style stone high altar with an altarpiece of the Martyrdom of Saint Laviero (18th century).

References in popular culture
The movie From the Vine is set in Acerenza.

References

External links

Cities and towns in Basilicata
Hilltowns in Basilicata